Invasive urothelial carcinoma is a type of transitional cell carcinoma. It is a type of cancer that develops in the urinary system:  the kidney, urinary bladder, and accessory organs. Transitional cell carcinoma is the most common type of bladder cancer and cancer of the ureter, urethra, renal pelvis, the ureters, the bladder, and parts of the urethra and urachus.  It originates from tissue lining the inner surface of these hollow organs - transitional epithelium.  The invading tumors can extend from the kidney collecting system to the bladder.

Carcinoma (from the Greek karkinos, or "crab", and -oma, "growth") is a type of cancer. A carcinoma is a cancer that begins in a tissue that lines the inner or outer surfaces of the body, and that generally arises from cells originating in the endodermal or ectodermal germ layer during embryogenesis.

Symptoms
Symptoms vary between individuals and can be dependent upon the stage of growth of the carcinoma. Presence of the carcinoma can lead to be asymptomatic blood in the urine (hematuria),  Hematuria can be visible or detected microscopically. Visible hematuria is when urine  appears red or brown and can be seen with the naked eye. Other symptoms are not specific. Other inflammatory conditions that affect the bladder and kidney can create similar symptoms. Early detection facilitates curing the disease. Other symptoms can involve:

pain or burning on urination
the sensation of not being able to completely empty the bladder
the sensation of needing to urinate more often or more frequently than normal

These symptoms are general and also indicate less serious problems.

Prognosis and treatment 

Prognosis is highly variable and dependent upon a multitude of factors. Reoccurrence does occur. Treatment is determined on a case-by-case basis.

See also 
Transitional epithelium

References

Bibliography

External links 

 

Epithelium
Aging-associated diseases

Cancer